Son of sevenless homolog 1 is a protein that in humans is encoded by the SOS1 gene.

Function 
SOS1 is a guanine nucleotide exchange factor (GEF) which interacts with RAS proteins to phosphorylate GDP into GTP, or from an inactive state to an active state to signal cell proliferation. RAS genes (e.g., MIM 190020) encode membrane-bound guanine nucleotide-binding proteins that function in the transduction of signals that control cell growth and differentiation. Binding of GTP activates RAS proteins, and subsequent hydrolysis of the bound GTP to GDP and phosphate inactivates signaling by these proteins. GTP binding can be catalyzed by guanine nucleotide exchange factors for RAS, and GTP hydrolysis can be accelerated by GTPase-activating proteins (GAPs). The first exchange factor to be identified for RAS was the S. cerevisiae Cdc25 gene product. Genetic analysis indicated that CDC25 is essential for activation of RAS proteins. In Drosophila, the protein encoded by the 'son of sevenless' gene (Sos) contains a domain that shows sequence similarity with the catalytic domain of Cdc25. Sos may act as a positive regulator of RAS by promoting guanine nucleotide exchange.

Clinical significance 

Recent studies also show that mutations in Sos1 can cause Noonan syndrome and hereditary gingival fibromatosis type 1. Noonan syndrome has also been shown to be caused by mutations in KRAS and PTPN11 genes. activators of the MAP kinase pathway.

Interactions 

SOS1 has been shown to interact with:

 ABI1,
 BCR gene, 
 CRK, 
 EPS8, 
 Epidermal growth factor receptor, 
 FRS2, 
 Grb2, 
 HRAS, 
 ITSN1, 
 MUC1, 
 NCK1, 
 PLCG1, 
 PTPN11, 
 SH3KBP1,  and
 SHC1. and

See also 
 Son of Sevenless

References

Further reading

External links 
  GeneReviews/NCBI/NIH/UW entry on Noonan syndrome
 http://www.noonansyndrome.org
 http://ghr.nlm.nih.gov/gene=sos1